The Cathedral of St. Joseph in Hartford, Connecticut, United States, is the mother church and seat of the Archdiocese of Hartford. Dedicated on May 15, 1962, it stands on the site of the old cathedral which had been destroyed in a fire. It is located on Farmington Avenue just outside downtown Hartford.

In 1979, the cathedral was included as a contributing property in the Asylum Avenue District, listed on the National Register of Historic Places.

History

Pope Gregory XVI established the states of Connecticut and Rhode Island as the Diocese of Hartford in 1843. Because Providence, Rhode Island had a larger Catholic population, Bishop William Tyler chose to reside there instead of Hartford. His two successors did likewise. Bishop Francis McFarland petitioned to have the diocese divided. After the Diocese of Providence was established in 1872, McFarland moved to Hartford where he bought the old Morgan estate for $75,000 for a cathedral, bishop's residence, and a motherhouse for the Sisters of Mercy. The convent was built first and the chapel was used as a pro-cathedral.

Brooklyn, New York architect Patrick Keely was hired to design the cathedral. Bishop Thomas Galberry, O.S.A., McFarland's successor, laid the cornerstone on April 29, 1877. The basement was dedicated for church use the following year. After Bishop Lawrence McMahon liquidated the diocese's debt he was able to complete the original St. Joseph's Cathedral, which was consecrated on May 8, 1892. The Gothic Revival structure was cruciform in shape and its exterior was clad in Portland rough brownstone. Two towers that rose  flanked the main facade. The interior featured an inlaid ceiling with wood from every country in the world, a rotunda with $100,000 worth of gold leaf, a bishop's throne that was carved oak, a marble high altar, and 72 stained glass windows. It was decorated with paintings and statues. Soil conditions necessitated renovations in 1938–1939 to stabilize the building. A fire destroyed the cathedral on December 31, 1956. Its cause was never determined. Structural engineers determined that the building could not be salvaged and the site was cleared.

The New York City architectural firm of Eggers & Higgins was chosen to design the present cathedral. On September 8, 1958, Archbishop Henry O'Brien presided over the formal groundbreaking. During construction, Sunday Masses were held in the auditorium of the Aetna Life Insurance Company building across the street and daily Masses were held in the school auditorium. Auxiliary Bishop John Hackett blessed the lower church on Christmas Eve 1960, and Archbishop O'Brien celebrated the first Mass later that night. Hackett laid the cornerstone for the cathedral on October 3, 1961, while the archbishop consecrated the bells for the carillon in 1961 and blessed the cross for the tower in 1962. Bishop Hackett consecrated the completed cathedral on May 15, 1962. It was built for about $10 million.

An addition that included a new entrance off Asylum Avenue, an elevator, and restrooms was completed in 2016. Two years later the exterior was cleaned and repaired as the limestone was starting to deteriorate. Other projects that are planned as a part of the “Forward With Faith” capital campaign include repairing the front plaza; creation of Cathedral Square that includes a pedestrian mall, park, and public gardens; and renovating the lower level of the cathedral into educational and community meeting facilities, a dining area, and a mausoleum.

On October 31, 2020, the cathedral hosted the beatification mass for the Rev. Michael J. McGivney, who founded the Knights of Columbus within the then Diocese of Hartford in 1882. A concurrent ceremony was held at St. Mary's Church in New Haven, CT, where McGivney was assigned as an associate pastor.

Architecture
The cathedral was designed using an International style interpretation of the Gothic style, and maintained the verticality of the old cathedral. The structure is composed of reinforced concrete covered with smooth light gray coursed limestone. A large frieze over the main entrance features the church's patron, Saint Joseph. The tall bronze doors weigh five and a half tons and are covered with biblical scenes. The blocks of stone used in the tall spire contrasts with the smooth stone of the walls. The "blocks are cut in a pattern of voids that causes a constant play of light and shadow." The bell chamber contains 12 bells cast in the Netherlands by Petit & Fritsen.

The interior of the cathedral is noted for its large expanse of spectacular stained glass windows crafted in Paris. They are reminiscent of those found in Paris' Sainte-Chapelle. The ceramic tile mural behind the altar depicting "Christ in Glory" is the largest in the world. The narthex is separated from the main nave by a wall of glass etched by Giovanni Hajnal. It depicts the Kingdom of Christ both on earth and in heaven. The capacity of the cathedral is about 1,750 people not including the two side chapels.

There are two main chapels on the side of the church. One contains a tabernacle and altar. It contains a mural of Jesus and his disciples. The chapel on the left has a mural depicting the Holy Family and contains the baptismal font. Other small chapels are made of mosaic and contain kneelers for visitors.

Organ
The pipe organ is the largest in Connecticut. The organ in the rear gallery was designed by the Austin Organ Company, which is based in Hartford. It has four manuals and includes six divisions, 81 stops, 95 registers, 114 ranks, and 6,878 pipes. The pipe organ in the Blessed Sacrament Chapel was also built by the Austin Organ Company, and it features three manuals, three divisions, 17 stops, 22 registers, 19 ranks, and 1,195 pipes. The organ has been used for many concerts.

Burials
Lawrence Stephen McMahon, Fifth Bishop of Hartford

See also

List of Catholic cathedrals in the United States
List of cathedrals in the United States

References

External links

Official Cathedral Site
Archdiocese of Hartford Official Site

Religious organizations established in 1872
Roman Catholic churches completed in 1962
Joseph, Hartford
Buildings and structures in Hartford, Connecticut
Roman Catholic churches in Hartford, Connecticut
Eggers & Higgins church buildings
Tourist attractions in Hartford, Connecticut
Modernist architecture in Connecticut
1872 establishments in Connecticut
Churches on the National Register of Historic Places in Connecticut
National Register of Historic Places in Hartford, Connecticut
Historic district contributing properties in Connecticut
Roman Catholic parishes of Archdiocese of Hartford
20th-century Roman Catholic church buildings in the United States